The siege of Ruthven Barracks that took place over the 10 – 11 February 1746 was part of the Jacobite rising of 1745.

In August 1745 the Jacobites had unsuccessfully laid siege to the barracks being repulsed by a small group of Government soldiers. However the Jacobites returned in February 1746 this time equipped with cannon,  and as a result the Government garrison surrendered. After the Government surrender the Jacobites burned Ruthven Barracks, although the damage must have been slight because they were still in use afterwards.

See also
Siege of Ruthven Barracks (1745)
Jacobite risings
Jacobite rising of 1745

References

Conflicts in 1746
1746 in Scotland
Ruthven